Pirron Yallock is a closed station located just west of the town of Pirron Yallock, on the Warrnambool railway line in Victoria, Australia. The station building is located at the station, but the platform has been demolished.

As well as the main station building, the station precinct had a number of sidings and a small goods (freight) platform and goods shed. There was also a livestock siding with unloading facilities and stock yards. Pirron Yallock had an adjacent racecourse and the station was quite busy at race times with trains conveying racegoers to these events with "special" race trains operating from Ballarat and Melbourne – Pirron Yallock had the first Victorian "Totalizator" outside Melbourne. There were locomotive servicing facilities – a locomotive watering tower for steam locomotives remains on site.

A station masters residence was located in the precinct and as gangers and trackworkers were employed and also permanently located at Pirron Yallock, there were also a number of railway houses.

Passengers desiring to join a train after the officer in charge had ceased duties were required to exhibit the red flag during daylight or light a red lamp in darkness to stop the train and obtain tickets from the guard.

The station building was renovated quite some time after closing – due to its heritage significance but stands lonely as testament to some unique building methods – gamble roofing – and to what was once a busy station.

The station was also an important crossing point for trains to and from Melbourne and Warrnambool with a long crossing loop located adjacent the station building. The precinct was protected by two semaphore home signals, one on the up side and one on the down side.

The station was one of 35 closed to passenger traffic on 4 October 1981, as part of the New Deal timetable for country passengers.

References

External links
Victorian Railway Stations gallery – Pirron Yallock

Railway stations closed in 1981
Disused railway stations in Victoria (Australia)
Victorian Heritage Register Barwon South West (region)